Palestine Times was the only English language daily Palestinian newspaper. It was a family-owned business with its main office in Ramallah. It was initially distributed all over the West Bank (including East Jerusalem) and the Gaza Strip. On March 13, 2007 the paper signed a contract with BAR, an Israeli newspaper distribution company, and was available in Israel too. It was to be aimed at the generally well-educated minority of Palestinians who speak English, as well as Israelis. The newspaper went out of business less than six months after its launch.

The paper was launched on November 27, 2006. Its editor-in-chief was Othman Fakhri Mohammed. Its stated aim was to reflect all aspects of Palestinian life accurately to the world. It received no funding from any Palestinian political party or faction, and aimed to be independent. According to Mohammed during an interview with the Israeli daily Haaretz, "[Writing freely about negative stories in the PA]'s not a problem. I am a Palestinian and the writers are Palestinians. Beyond the fact that I'm biased in favor of the Palestinian cause, I don't see any problem with criticizing corruption or political phenomena in the territories. Our problem is that in this part of the world, they don't sue you for damaging someone, they simply shoot you. Therefore, I have to be careful." Ynetnews, an online Israeli English-language news site, included a "Congratulations" blurb over an article reporting on the publication of the newspaper. It was funded by advertising, subscriptions and sales.

Among the notable journalists working for the paper were Khalid Amayreh, a journalist from Dura, Hebron region, whose original copy is written in English, unlike some of the paper's journalists who wrote in Arabic and are then translated. Almost all of the paper's journalistic contributors are Palestinians.

The paper was not a translation edition, since no Arabic version existed. In this respect, the paper was more similar in publishing to the English-only Jerusalem Post rather than the Hebrew language Haaretz with its English edition. However, a significant percentage of the paper's stories are translated from Arabic original copy in-house.

A monthly news website of the same name was previously established at www.ptimes.org . It is not associated with the daily paper. In addition, and between 1999 until 2017, a new media website under the name The Palestine Times was established at www.palestinetimes.com.

The paper ceased publication on May 18, 2007, due to "extreme financial difficulties." On July 18, the Jerusalem Post reported that Mohammed plans to resume publication of the paper in August. It is yet to be done. As of 2014, the newspaper's website (www.times.ps) is inactive.

References

External links
 Palestine Times daily

Newspapers published in the State of Palestine
Defunct newspapers
Publications established in 2006
Publications disestablished in 2007
English-language newspapers published in Arab countries
2006 establishments in the Palestinian territories
2007 disestablishments in the Palestinian territories